Burbank Bus (stylized as burbankbus) in Burbank, California is a city-operated public transport bus service, providing local routes within the city including connections with rail service to Los Angeles or surrounding suburbs. Burbank Bus complements the Los Angeles County Metropolitan Transportation Authority's crosstown routes through the city.

MV Transportation has operated the system for the city since the year 2011.

Service

Regular Routes
Noho/Airport Route (serving the North Hollywood LA Metro station and Hollywood Burbank Airport)
Noho/Media District Route (serving the North Hollywood LA Metro station)
Pink Route (connecting the Universal City/Studio City LA Metro station and Downtown Burbank Metrorail station)

Paratransit
Burbank Bus Senior and Disabled (BBS&D) paratransit provides curb-to-curb transportation services for seniors and persons with disabilities living in Burbank, allowing them to maintain healthy and active lifestyles. To be eligible for BBS&D, City of Burbank residents must be 60 years of age or older or qualify by nature of a disability.

References

External link
 

Public transportation in the San Fernando Valley
Public transportation in Los Angeles County, California
Burbank, California
Bus transportation in California